Daniel Dencik (born 1972) is a Danish writer and film director currently residing in Samoa. He has published ten books, ranging from poetry to short stories and essays as well as four novels.

He has studied Philosophy at Stockholm University, where he wrote his thesis about the existentialism of Kierkegaard. Later he graduated as a film editor from the National Film School of Denmark. In 1998 he had his first book of poetry published by Gyldendal. His work has been divided between film and literature ever since.

He is the editor of the cult movie Nói albinói (2003) by Dagur Kari.

He is writing essays on subjects ranging from the sport of professional cycling to the meaning of solitude and religion. He has covered Tour de France for the Danish daily paper Politiken, and for the magazine Euroman.

As of 2012, he has also been directing films, most notably the documentary Expedition To The End of The World. In 2012 he received The Reel Talent Award at CPH:DOX. His portrait of the painter Tal R entitled Tal R: The Virgin won a Danish Academy Award 2014 for best short documentary.

2015 marked his debut in narrative films with the historical drama, Gold Coast. The film revolves around the Europe's colonial past in West Africa. It was shot on locations in Ghana and Burkina Faso and stars Jakob Oftebro and Danica Curcic. The soundtrack is composed by Angelo Badalamenti. It was a Danish-Ghanaian co-production with a budget of €2 million.

Gold Coast had its international premiere at the 2015 Karlovy Vary Film Festival.

He has received the biggest talent award in Danish film, the prestigious Nordisk Film Award, in 2014.

His controversial novel Anden person ental (2014) was praised by the critics and the focus of a lot of attention in the Danish press. In 2016 he published a collection af short stories titled Grand Danois (2016). This work was nominated for Book of the Year in Denmark. A story from the book was published by World Literature Today.

His later books have been translated into German, Dutch, and Swedish.

Filmography
Moon Rider (2012) - documentary
Expedition To The End of The World (2013) - documentary
Tal R: The Virgin (2013) - short documentary
Gold Coast (2015) - fiction feature
The Vanishing Act (2019) - short documentary
The Butler (2019) - short documentary
Miss Osaka (2021) - fiction feature

References

External links

1972 births
Living people
Danish male writers
Danish film directors